The gray fox is a species of fox found in North, Central, and northern South America.

Grey fox or gray fox may also refer to:

Animals
 South American gray fox, a species of zorro ("false foxes") found in southern South America

Other
 Gray Fox (military), the codename used by the Intelligence Support Activity at the beginning of the War in Afghanistan
 "Gray Fox", a nickname for college basketball coach Everett Case
 USNSCS Grayfox, a United States Naval Sea Cadet Corps training vessel for cadets
 The Grey Fox, a 1982 film
 Gray Fox (Metal Gear), a character in the Metal Gear videogame franchise
 The Grey Fox, a fictional character in Red Panda Adventures

See also
 Grey (disambiguation)
 Fox (disambiguation)
 Silver fox (disambiguation)

Animal common name disambiguation pages